Jeff Groth may refer to:
Jeff Groth (American football) (born 1957), former American football wide receiver
Jeff Groth (film editor), film and television editor